Patterns of Conflict was a presentation by Colonel John Boyd outlining his theories on modern combat and how the key to success was to upset the enemy's "observation-orientation-decision-action time cycle or loop", or OODA loop. Patterns developed the idea of a "counter-blitz", a blitzkrieg in reverse, with numerous attacks followed by withdrawals to the rear. The aim was to confuse the enemy by presenting no apparent strategy, reveal the enemy's intentions through the strength of the response, and present a misleading picture of the defender's own actions in order to disrupt the attacker's future plan of action.

First presented in 1976, Patterns grew enormously popular through the 1970s, and was re-presented on many occasions, including a personal presentation to Dick Cheney in 1981. A 1980 presentation to the US Marine Corps led to the development of an entirely new doctrinal system. Boyd's ideas also became the basis for the AirLand Battle, the US Army's European warfighting doctrine from 1982 into the late 1990s. Patterns has been widely regarded as one of the most influential works of warfighting theory of all time and has been compared to the writings of Sun Tsu. Based on Patterns and the work that followed, Boyd has been called "America's greatest military theorist".

Description

E-M background
Boyd was a US Air Force colonel who had developed the energy–maneuverability theory of air combat. This was based on formulas that revealed a fighter aircraft's ability to maneuver, allowing direct comparison between different designs using simple metrics. This work became extremely influential over time, resulting in changes to the design of the F-15 Eagle, and producing the basic design parameters of the F-16 Fighting Falcon.

Much of the E-M theory was based on the idea of generating rapid "transients", continual changes in position and maneuvering. The idea was for a fighter pilot to keep the enemy continually guessing his intentions, thereby delaying the decision-making process to the point that the enemy would be unable to predict the future position of his aircraft. To do this, a fighter craft would need to be able to quickly gain or lose energy, as well as having a high roll rate in order to generate out-of-plane maneuvers.

Patterns is essentially a generalization of this concept, applying to the entire war fighting experience instead of a single dogfight.

Introductory material
Patterns opens with a short discussion of the E-M theory, although not by name. It calls for a fighter that can "choose engagement opportunities - yet has fast transient ... characteristics." It continues by stating that the idea of fast transients in a fighter suggests that the key to winning any engagement is to have a faster tempo of operations. Boyd then introduces the concept of the OODA loop, and suggests that a fast enough response loop can "[c]ollapse [the] adversary's system into confusion and disorder by causing him to over and under react to activity". The aim was to make a series of actions that were so confusing that the enemy would expend too much of his resources on small actions and not enough on large ones, eventually causing his forces to be out-of-place and subject to encirclement.

The presentation continues with an overview of several historically important battles and commanders, noting in particular their use of confusing feints that contributed to victory. He compares these with modern commanders and theory, which Boyd felt were too focused on winning the battle directly, instead of shattering the enemy's forces before the battle even took place. Among early examples are Marathon, Leuctra, Arbela and Cannae. He then turns to more modern battles, including the Mongol invasion of Khwarezmia and an extensive discussion of Napoleon's battles.

A considerable portion of the introductory material covers the great changes in combat during World War I and World War II. This discussion evolves into a more general discussion of the blitzkrieg and the "schwerpunkt" concept, where all available forces are concentrated at small points in order to overwhelm the local defence. However, he also notes that there was an understanding on the part of the German command that much of the success of these strategies relied on rapid decision making. Boyd suggests that this is an example of their operating with a faster OODA loop. He then notes that there was a major difference between the impression of the blitzkrieg and the actual actions, that it appeared to be smooth and co-ordinated, illustrated with curving lines on maps, while in fact it was rarely a straight thrust and included many changes of direction.

Boyd then considers a number of examples of guerrilla warfare, which he illustrates has many of the same general qualities as the blitzkrieg, in that the attacks appear random and uncoordinated. Since the defender is kept confused, overwhelming forces need to be employed in order to defend against these actions. He concludes that the "Blitz and Guerrillas, by operating in a directed, yet more indistinct, more irregular, and quicker manner, operate inside their adversaries' observation-orientation-decision-action loops". He continues by considering the effect of morale on such operations, and general aims for containing guerrilla actions, in particular.

Aside: modern combat
During much of the post-WWII era, most US doctrine posited a massive land war in Europe, during which the Warsaw Pact would employ a massive superiority of armor using blitzkrieg tactics to break through NATO defences.

The tactical art of the blitzkrieg requires the attacking force to turn away from strongpoints in an effort to continue high-speed movement. If the goal of the attacker is high-speed movement, then the goal of the defender is to slow that movement. During WWII the tactic for achieving this was to place forces in front and to the sides of the armored spearhead. When the spearhead met them, the spearhead would attempt to turn away in order to find maneuvering room for further advance. A defending force is then placed in front of that line of advance, and so on, causing the spearhead to repeatedly turn. The goal is to force the spearhead into an ever-decreasing area of maneuver, and eventually pinch it off.

Such tactics were put to good use against the Germans during the Battle of the Bulge. The German forces initially encountered little resistance, and their line of advance to the west quickly became apparent. US forces rushed from the north and south to place themselves on either side of the line of advance. Turning away from these forces, the spearhead met additional groups on the opposite side of the line, and their room for movement was progressively whittled down and slowed. When the battle ended, the German forces were arrayed along a V-shaped channel formed by the US divisions. There was no room to maneuver and further progress would require another breakthrough.

This pattern of defence relies on swift movements of the defender and weight of numbers. If the defence is greatly outnumbered, it becomes difficult to concentrate enough forces in enough places to pinch off the spearhead. This was certainly the case in the projections for future war in Europe, where it was hoped that massive NATO airpower operating behind the front lines would be used to starve the spearhead of supplies, allowing the much smaller defending forces to maneuver more quickly in relative terms.

Patterns instead suggests an entirely different solution to the problem, one in which a smaller force would so confuse the enemy that his forward momentum would be stopped without the need to get in front.

Counter-blitz
After considerable introductory material, the last quarter of Boyd's presentation turns to its primary point, the "counter-blitz". This is a theory of tactics that aims to upset the opposing commanders' OODA loop, causing their actions to become ineffectual and their own armored attack to falter. There are a number of different ways this is to be accomplished, but generally they all rely on building up a false image of the defender's actions, deliberately presenting forces in locations that appear to suggest a line of action and then attacking from different locations entirely.

Key to the entire concept is rapid movement. The goal is to think not in terms of "layers of defence" as in traditional counter-armor doctrine, but in terms of "channels" that the enemy will be forced into. Once channelized, any commander in the field will have the capability to launch flanking attacks at any point on his own initiative. Such attacks would appear random to the enemy, and would be considered uncoordinated under traditional planning, but would in fact all be carrying out the primary goal of the tactic, causing confusion. In the wrap-up section, Boyd concludes that the art of success is to "[a]ppear to be an unsolvable cryptogram while operating in a directed way" while also attempting to convince potential enemies and neutrals of the superiority of the commander so that they "are empathetic towards our success."

Reception
In January 1980 Boyd gave his briefing Patterns of Conflict at the Marine Corps Amphibious Warfare School. This led to the instructor at the time, Michael Wyly, and Boyd changing the curriculum, with the blessing of General Trainor. Trainor later asked Wyly to write a new tactics manual for the Marines. John Schmitt, guided by General Alfred M. Gray, Jr. wrote Warfighting, collaborating with John Boyd during the process. Wyly, Lind, and a few other junior officers are credited with developing concepts for what would become the Marine model of maneuver warfare.

In 1981 Boyd presented Patterns to Richard Cheney, then a member of the United States House of Representatives. By 1990 Boyd had moved to Florida because of declining health, but Cheney (then the Secretary of Defense in the George H. W. Bush administration) called him back to work on the plans for Operation Desert Storm. Boyd had substantial influence on the ultimate "left hook" design of the plan.

References
Citations

Bibliography

 John Boyd, "Patterns of Conflict", December 1986
 Robert Coram, "Boyd: The Fighter Pilot Who Changed the Art of War", Little Brown, 2002

Military doctrines
1976 works